Highgrove is an 18-story luxury high-rise in Stamford, Connecticut. Designed by Robert A.M. Stern, the Dean of Architecture at Yale University, Highgrove consists of 92 residences. Highgrove is located on Forest and Grove Street in Downtown Stamford.

Developer woes

In September 2009, prior to the completion of the Highgrove, its developer was sued by Florida's Attorney General for its failure to complete another condominium project in Palm Beach, Florida.

References

External links

Apartment buildings in Connecticut
Buildings and structures in Stamford, Connecticut
Skyscrapers in Connecticut
Residential skyscrapers in Connecticut